Charles Francis William Heron (1853 – 23 October 1914) was an English footballer who made one appearance as a forward for England and was a member of the Wanderers side that won the FA Cup in 1876.

Playing career
Heron, the younger brother of Hubert Heron, was born in Uxbridge, west London and attended Mill Hill School and Cranleigh School. He was a founding member of the Uxbridge Football Club on 3 February 1871 before joining his brother at Wanderers F.C. in the 1874-75 season.
 
He made his solitary appearance for England in the fifth international match played at Hamilton Crescent, Partick on 4 March 1876. Heron played alongside his elder brother Hubert who was appointed team captain. According to Philip Gibbons, "England struggled throughout the game, which saw the home team run out winners by three goals to nil."

A week after the England match, he was part of the Wanderers team that met the Old Etonians in the 1876 FA Cup Final at the Kennington Oval. En route to the final, he scored two "crucial" goals against Sheffield in the third round.

In the final, the first match ended in a 1–1 draw, with the Wanderers victorious 3–0 in the replay on 18 March, with two goals from Thomas Hughes and one by Charles Wollaston. Hubert also played for Wanderers in this match; it would be another 120 years before a pair of brothers again played together in an FA Cup-final winning side and for England in the same season, when Gary and Phil Neville did so in 1996.
During his career he also played for Swifts and Windsor Home Park.

Later career
Heron played as an amateur and earned his living as a wine merchant in Bournemouth.

Honours
Wanderers
FA Cup winners: 1876

References

External links

England profile

1853 births
1914 deaths
Footballers from Uxbridge
People educated at Mill Hill School
People educated at Cranleigh School
English footballers
England international footballers
Uxbridge F.C. players
Wanderers F.C. players
Swifts F.C. players
Association football forwards
FA Cup Final players